The 2009 El Paso mayoral election was held on May 14, 2009 to elect the mayor of El Paso, Texas. It saw the reelection of incumbent mayor John Cook.

No runoff was required, as Cook secured a majority of the vote in the initial round.

Results

References

El Paso mayoral
El Paso
Mayoral elections in El Paso, Texas
Non-partisan elections